Rugby Club Suresnes Hauts-de-Seine is a French rugby union club from Suresnes, Hauts-de-Seine that play in the Nationale, third tier of the French league system.

Current standings

References

External links
Official website

Rugby clubs established in 1973
Union Cognac Saint-Jean-d'Angély
Sport in Hauts-de-Seine